View of Montmartre from Cité des Fleurs to Les Batignolles is an oil-on-canvas painting by Alfred Sisley, produced in spring 1869 and now in the Musée de Grenoble. It bears national museums reference France Inv. MG 1317. It was given to that museum in 1901 by the artist's friend and fellow painter Joseph-Auguste Rousselin, only two years after Sisley's death. It is one of the first Impressionist paintings to depict Montmartre, showing it as in very verdant surrounds.

Context 

Despite being born in Paris, Sisley did not find it easy to produce views of the city, instead preferring industrial subjects such as View of the Canal Saint-Martin or depicting the city from a distance as in this work. He painted it from his apartment at 27 Cité des Fleurs, Batignolles, where he lived with his companion Marie-Adélaïde-Eugénie Lescouezec between 1867 and 1873 and where their children Pierre and Jeanne were born on 17 June 1867 and 29 January 1869. Richard Shone notes that even at this date Sisley's compositions showed more interest in the water and sky than in urban life and the buildings, meaning he was already effectively a landscape painter. MaryAnne Stevens contrasts the work with the stormy skies and dramatic mills in the depictions of Montmartre by Georges Michel and Constant Troyon.

References

Paintings by Alfred Sisley
1869 paintings
Paintings in Grenoble
Paintings of Montmartre